Anders Nilsson (born May 3, 1956) is a scientist who works in the field of chemical physics at Stockholm University. He is best known for his studies of the structure and dynamics of water with the goal of understanding the origin of the unusual physical properties that make this liquid entirely unique on Earth. His other research interests include studying chemical reactions as they occur in real time and energy transformations that have implications for future energy use.

Career 
Nilsson received his M.Sc. (1980) in Chemical Engineering from Royal Institute of Technology in Stockholm and his PhD in the laboratory created by the Nobel Laureate Kai Siegbahn in Uppsala University in 1989 and was conferred with the Ångström Award for Outstanding PhD thesis. He later went to Stanford University in USA and became an Associate professor in 2000 and later a Professor in 2008 in the field of Photon science. He later returned to Sweden as a professor in Chemical Physics at Stockholm University in 2014. He became an Honorary Doctor in 2015 at Denmark Technical University.

Research 
Nilsson has authored more than 300 papers in peer-reviewed journals. His research has involved extensive use of powerful X-ray sources such as synchrotrons and x-ray free electron laser (XFEL) sources. His research interests include X-ray laser spectroscopy and scattering, chemical bonding and reactions on surfaces, ultrafast heterogeneous catalysis, electrocatalysis in fuel cells, photocatalysis for converting sunlight to fuels, and structure of water and aqueous solutions.

Other works 

Nilsson had a spiritual opening in 1993 and has since then pursued a strong interest in spirituality. He is not affiliated to any spiritual school or tradition, nor has he studied under any guru, but instead followed his inner voice and intuition to lead him. He has published his spiritual views in the book The Gentle Way of the Heart in 2014 which became a finalist in the US Best Book awards and won a silver medal in the Benjamin Franklin awards

Published books 

 Chemical Bonding at Surfaces and Interfaces, Anders Nilsson, Lars GM Pettersson and Jens Nørskov, Elsevier 2008, 
 The Gentle Way of the Heart; Discover the Light Within, Anders Nilsson, Nordic Light Books 2014,

References 

1956 births
KTH Royal Institute of Technology alumni
Uppsala University alumni
Stanford University faculty
Academic staff of Stockholm University
Living people